Antonina Roll-Mecak is a Romanian-born American molecular biophysicist. She is currently the Senior Investigator and Chief of the Unit of Cell Biology and Biophysics at the National Institutes of Health. She holds appointments at the National Institute of Neurological Disorders and Stroke; and at the Biochemistry and Biophysics Center of the National Heart, Lung and Blood Institute. Roll-Mecak is known for her work in understanding cytoskeletal regulation, mechanisms of microtubule dynamics and laying the groundwork for deciphering the complexities of the tubulin code. She is also known for her work on microtubule severing enzymes spastin and Katanin.

Early life and education 
Antonina Roll-Mecak was born in Romania. Her father was an engineer and scientist. Growing up, her father would tutor her in Newtonian physics, creating complex pulley-related problems for her to solve, and would teach her the principles of programming through Fortran punch cards. During summers, she attended camps focused on math and science, and trained for academic Olympiads. She also spent summer breaks training for and competing in piano competitions, and as a child she aspired to be a concert pianist. However, due to the travel restrictions existing in Romania at the time, she ultimately chose to pursue a scientific path.

She attended high school at the Gheorghe Lazăr National College in Sibiu, in the Transylvania region. The school specializes in science education, and acceptance into the school was dependent on success in preliminary entrance exams.

Roll-Mecak received her bachelor's degree in chemical engineering from Cooper Union in New York City, which operates on a full-tuition scholarship basis. During her studies, she completed a summer internship at Mount Sinai School of Medicine, where she worked with Ernie Mehler and Harel Weinstein. Part of her inspiration to pursue structural biology came from a seminar on protein structure she attended at the New York Academy of Sciences as a student. She received her Bachelor of Engineering summa cum laude in 1996.

She received her PhD in molecular biophysics in 2002 from the Rockefeller University. There, she studied with Stephen Burley, and worked with others scientists such as Günter Blobel and Rod MacKinnon. Her PhD work used X-ray crystallography to determine the structure and mechanism of the two translation initiation GTPases essential for assembling an 80S ribosome primed for protein synthesis.

Career 
After receiving her doctorate, she worked at the University of California, San Francisco, from 2003 to 2009 as a Damon Runyon and Burroughs Wellcome Career Award postdoctoral fellow with Ron Vale. There, she identified spastin as a novel microtubule-severing enzyme and used hybrid structural biology methods and light microscopy to reveal its mechanisms of action. Her analyses led to the proposal that severing enzymes break the microtubule by pulling single tubulin molecules out of the microtubule lattice.

In 2010 she was appointed as a principal investigator and unit head at the National Institutes of Health. Her primary appointment is in the National Institute of Neurological Disorders and Stroke (NINDS) and she has a joint appointment in the Biochemistry and Biophysics Center at the National Heart, Lung and Blood Institute (NHLBI). She was promoted to tenured Senior Investigator in 2017. Her work focuses on how genetic isoform variation and chemical diversity (posttranslational modifications) of tubulin regulate the dynamics and mechanical properties of microtubules and constitutes a code that is interpreted by microtubule based motors and associated proteins. This code is also referred to as a "tubulin code.". She has said a career aspiration of hers is to create a dynamic high-resolution map of posttranslational modifications in cells and watch as it changes to regulate the targeting and activity of motors and microtubule-associated proteins. Her lab also focuses on the mechanism of microtubule severing enzymes and microtubule repair.

Personal life 
Roll-Mecak has a son. In her spare time, she enjoys classical music, and has noted that while attending school in New York City she often attended multiple concerts or opera performances during the week in between running experiments as a student.

When a colleague leaves her lab, Roll-Mecak is known to give them a daruma doll, a lucky charm in Japanese folk culture that comes with its eyes unpainted. The recipient paints in one of the eyes and makes a wish, and the second eye is added when the wish is granted.

Select publications 

 
 
 
 Vemu, Annapurna; Szczesna, Ewa; Zehr, Elena A.; Spector, Jeffrey O.; Grigorieff, Nikolaus; Deaconescu, Alexandra M.; Roll-Mecak, Antonina (2018-08-24). "Severing enzymes amplify microtubule arrays through lattice GTP-tubulin incorporation". Science. 361 (6404): eaau1504. doi:10.1126/science.aau1504. ISSN 1095-9203. PMC 6510489. PMID 30139843.
 Zehr, Elena A.; Szyk, Agnieszka; Szczesna, Ewa; Roll-Mecak, Antonina (2020-01-06). "Katanin Grips the β-Tubulin Tail through an Electropositive Double Spiral to Sever Microtubules". Developmental Cell. 52 (1): 118–131.e6. doi:10.1016/j.devcel.2019.10.010. ISSN 1878-1551. PMC 7060837. PMID 31735665.

Awards 

 Burroughs Wellcome Career Award
 NIH Pathway to Independence Award
 Searle Scholar Award (2010)
 Margaret Oakley Dayhoff Award from the Biophysical Society (2015)
 Blavatnik National Awards for Young Scientists (2016)
 Keith R. Porter Award (2017)
 Emerging Leader Prize from the American Society for Cell Biology (2016)
 International Award from the Biochemical Society (2023)

References

External links 
 
 Website for the Roll-Mecak Lab
 Oral history interview transcript with Antonina Roll-Mecak on 1 June 2020, American Institute of Physics, Niels Bohr Library & Archives
 NIH interview video with Dr. Antonina Roll-Mecak

Romanian women physicists
Year of birth missing (living people)
Living people
Molecular biophysics
Molecular biologists
Cooper Union alumni
Women physicists
Romanian scientists
Romanian academics